Robert Ksiezak (born 15 January 1987 in Adelaide, South Australia) is a former motorcycle speedway rider from Australia.

Career 
Ksiezak started his British career with the Edinburgh Monarchs in 2005. He lost his team place halfway through the 2006 season and was quickly signed by Edinburgh's rivals the Glasgow Tigers. He chose to stay with Glasgow in 2007, leading to the club purchasing his contract from Edinburgh. He agreed terms to be the Belle Vue Aces number 8 for the 2008 season.

Ksiezak has Polish and Australian citizenship. On 6 May 2008 he gained a Polish speedway licence (Licencja "Ż") at Toruń. Since then he has taken part in the Polish Championships as a Polish domestic rider (as Robert Księżak).

Ksiezak finished second in the Gillman Division 1 Solo Championship at his home track in Adelaide, the Gillman Speedway in 2009 and 2012. He was also the winner of the Jack Young Solo Cup at Gillman in 2006. The Jack Young Cup is named in honour of Adelaide's 1951 and 1952 Speedway World Champion who died in 1987. Ksiezak joined the likes of Jimmy Nilsen, Leigh Adams and Tomasz Gollob as a winner of the Cup.

World Final appearances

Individual U-21 World Championship
 2007 -  Ostrów Wielkopolski, Edward Jancarz Stadium - Reserve - Did not ride

Under-21 World Cup 
 2008 -  Holsted - 4th - 33pts (2)

References 

1987 births
Living people
Australian speedway riders
Polish speedway riders
Sportspeople from Adelaide
Belle Vue Aces riders
Edinburgh Monarchs riders
Glasgow Tigers riders
Plymouth Devils riders
Stoke Potters riders